Nepenthes copelandii (after Edwin Copeland) is a species of pitcher plant native to the island of Mindanao in the Philippines. Originally known from Mount Apo near Davao City and Mount Pasian near Bislig, it has since been discovered on a number of peaks throughout Mindanao. It may also be present on the nearby island of Camiguin. The species has a wide altitudinal distribution of 1100–2400 m above sea level. Nepenthes copelandii has no known natural hybrids. No forms or varieties have been described.

The Mount Apo form has been cultivated by Australian hobbyists since the early 1980s, the taxon being referred to as "N. sp. Philippines No. 2". Plants from Mount Pasian only entered cultivation much later.

Nepenthes copelandii belongs to the informal "N. alata group", which also includes N. alata, N. ceciliae, N. extincta, N. graciliflora, N. hamiguitanensis, N. kitanglad, N. kurata, N. leyte, N. mindanaoensis, N. negros, N. ramos, N. saranganiensis, and N. ultra. These species are united by a number of morphological characters, including winged petioles, lids with basal ridges on the lower surface (often elaborated into appendages), and upper pitchers that are usually broadest near the base.

In his Carnivorous Plant Database, taxonomist Jan Schlauer treats N. copelandii as a heterotypic synonym of N. alata.

References

Further reading

 Amoroso, V.B., L.D. Obsioma, J.B. Arlalejo, R.A. Aspiras, D.P. Capili, J.J.A. Polizon & E.B. Sumile 2009. Inventory and conservation of endangered, endemic and economically important flora of Hamiguitan Range, southern Philippines. Blumea 54(1–3): 71–76. 
 Amoroso, V.B. & R.A. Aspiras 2011. Hamiguitan Range: a sanctuary for native flora. Saudi Journal of Biological Sciences 18(1): 7–15. 
 Bonhomme, V., H. Pelloux-Prayer, E. Jousselin, Y. Forterre, J.-J. Labat & L. Gaume 2011. Slippery or sticky? Functional diversity in the trapping strategy of Nepenthes carnivorous plants. New Phytologist 191(2): 545–554. 
 Cheek, M.R. & M.H.P. Jebb 2001. Nepenthaceae. Flora Malesiana 15: 1–157.
  Gronemeyer, T. 2008. Nepenthes auf den Philippinen – ein Reisebericht. Das Taublatt 60: 15–27.
  McPherson, S. & T. Gronemeyer 2008. Die Nepenthesarten der Philippinen: eine Fotodokumentation. Das Taublatt 60: 34–78.
Borneo Exotics: Nepenthes copelandii – Discovery and Rediscovery

External links
Photographs of N. copelandii at the Carnivorous Plant Photofinder

copelandii
Endemic flora of the Philippines
Flora of Mindanao
Carnivorous plants of Asia
Plants described in 1908